is the 16th single by Japanese singer Yōko Oginome. Written by Takafumi Sotoma and Ryō Asuka, the single was released on July 21, 1988, by Victor Entertainment.

Background and release
The song was used as the theme song of the film .

"Dear (Cobalt no Kanata e)" peaked at No. 2 on Oricon's singles chart. It also sold over 136,000 copies.

Track listing
All music is composed by Ryō Asuka; all music is arranged by Nobuyuki Shimizu.

Charts
Weekly charts

Year-end charts

References

External links

1988 singles
Yōko Oginome songs
Japanese-language songs
Victor Entertainment singles